Ellman's was a major catalog merchant. It was located in suburban locations of Georgia and North Carolina, mainly Atlanta and Charlotte. Directly competing with Service Merchandise, Ellman's was ultimately bought out by Service Merchandise in 1985 and all stores were converted to Service Merchandise.

Ellman's corporate offices were located in Smyrna, Georgia on Cobb Parkway.  They had showrooms in Georgia, Charlotte, NC and Greensboro, NC.

References

Defunct retail companies of the United States
Catalog showrooms
Retail companies disestablished in 1985